Ministry of Interior Hall (Persian: تالار وزارت کشور – Tālār e Vezarat e Keshvar), is a concert hall in Tehran. Its one of the most important concert halls in Tehran.

Gallery

References 

Buildings and structures in Tehran
Concert halls in Iran
Culture in Tehran